Breland Station is a railway station on the Sørlandet Line situated in the village of Breland in Lindesnes municipality in Agder county, Norway. Located  from Oslo Central Station, it is served by a single long-distance train in each direction, operated by Go-Ahead Norge, to serve commuter traffic to and from the town of Kristiansand.

The station was opened on 17 December 1943 as part of the segment of the Sørlandet Line between Kristiansand and Sira. The line past the station was electrified in 1946 and the station automated in 1969. The following year the station became unmanned and the station building was demolished in 1987. The Norwegian National Rail Administration has decided to close the station in 2019, as it only served 2,200 annual passengers in 2008.

History
Breland Station was built during the Second World War under the German-administrated expansion of the Sørlandet Line west of Kristiansand. The station building was completed in 1942 after designs by NSB Arkitektkontor. It was originally proposed to be named Bredland, but this was changed to Breland. Irregular revenue traffic commenced on the line on 17 December 1943 and the station became operative from the same day. Ordinary traffic commenced on 1 March 1944. Electric traction was not introduced until 16 May 1946, as part of the electrification from Marnardal Station to Kristiansand Station.

An interlocking system became operational on 10 September 1969, allowing the station to become remotely controlled from 19 November 1969. The station became unmanned from 1 June 1970, and the station building was demolished in 1987.

Facilities
The station features a  passing loop. There is a waiting shed.

Like the other stations along the Sørlandet Line, the now demolished station building at Breland received a standardized design. It was built in the overall Neoclassical architecture style adapted in the 1920s. By the 1940s the designs had been altered to include elements of functionalism. It has siding of weatherboard.

Breland Station features free parking for eight cars. The station serves the village of Breland in Marnardal, which has about 70 residents within  of the station. The train is the sole form of public transport from the community. It had 2,200 annual passengers in 2008.

Service
The station is served by long-distance trains operated by the Norwegian State Railways. Because of the limit catchment, only a single train in each direction serves the station each day. This is aimed at commuting to Kristiansand—a morning train to town and an afternoon train from town. These trains continue onwards to Oslo and Stavanger, respectively. Travel time to Kristiansand is 18 minutes.

Future
The short platforms have caused the Norwegian Railway Authority to demand that they be lengthened by 2019, or the station will be closed. The National Rail Administration has decided that an  investment in the station was not worthwhile. The closing was announced in 2010, along with the closing of five other stations on the line. Passengers from Breland can drive  to Nodeland Station and take the train from there. Not stopping at Breland will allow the trains to save about two minutes. As the schedule is tied to passing loops, this will probably not save time overall for the line, but it will allow for more robustness.

References

Railway stations in Agder
Railway stations on the Sørlandet Line
Railway stations opened in 1943
Marnardal